The 1903 Southern African Customs Union Agreement was a multilateral treaty between the British colonies and protectorates in Southern Africa that created a customs union between the territories.

After the British victory in the Second Boer War, movements began to unify and consolidate British holdings in Southern Africa. The 1903 Customs Union Agreement was signed by the parties to the Agreement over the course of a month in several different locations. The dates on which it was signed were 6, 12, and 25 May and 3 June 1903, and signings took place in Johannesburg, Pietermaritzburg, Douglas, and Salisbury. The Agreement was signed by the governments of the Cape Colony, the Colony of Natal, the Orange River Colony, the Transvaal Colony, and Southern Rhodesia. The Governor of the Cape Colony, who was the High Commissioner for Southern Africa, also signed on behalf of Basutoland and the Bechuanaland Protectorate. Swaziland was admitted to the union in a supplementary protocol that was agreed to in 1904, while North-western Rhodesia was admitted in 1905.

The Agreement established a customs union area with free trade amongst the parties. The success of the customs union encouraged some British residents to seek political unification, which ultimately resulted in the creation of the Union of South Africa in 1910. (Basutoland, Southern Rhodesia, and Swaziland did not join the political union.) In 1910, the Southern African Customs Union was created as the successor to the 1903 union;  however, Southern Rhodesia did not join the 1910 customs union.

References
Jean Van Der Poel, Railways and Customs Policies in South Africa, 1885–1910 (London: Longmans, Green, 1933)
Clive Parry (ed), Consolidated Treaty Series (Dobbs Ferry, NY: Oceana, 1969) vol. 193, p. 126 (text of treaty).

1903 in South Africa
1903 in Southern Rhodesia
British colonisation in Africa
Customs treaties
Treaties concluded in 1903
Treaties entered into force in 1903
Treaties of Basutoland
Treaties of the Bechuanaland Protectorate
Treaties of the Cape Colony
Treaties of the Colony of Natal
Treaties of the Orange River Colony
Treaties of Southern Rhodesia
Treaties of Eswatini
Treaties of the Transvaal Colony
1903 in South African law
1903 in Africa